The Disc Golf Pro Tour was founded in 2016 by Steve Dodge and Nate Heinold. The DGPT is the highest level of competition in professional disc golf. The tour currently operates two tours, the Elite Series and Silver Series, both featuring men's and women's professional divisions. Through points earned by finishing at DGPT tournaments, competitors can earn berths in the final season event, the Tour Championship.

Media coverage 
Since 2020 live coverage of both MPO and FPO Elite Series divisions have been broadcast through the Disc Golf Network, a subscription-based streaming channel. Additionally, post-produced condensed coverage is available on YouTube through JomezPro, GK Pro, Gatekeeper Media, and other channels.

In November 2020 ESPN2 broadcast a tape-delayed package covering the final round of the 2020 Tour Championship produced by Jomez Productions.

Seasons

2016 Tour

2017 Tour

2018 Tour

2019 Tour

2020 Tour

2021 Tour

2022 Tour

2022-2023 Tour

References 

Disc golf
Flying disc
Professional sports leagues in the United States
2016 establishments in the United States